The Photographer or Mr. Photographer (Spanish: El señor fotógrafo) is a 1953 Mexican comedy thriller film directed by Miguel M. Delgado and starring Cantinflas, Rosita Arenas and Ángel Garasa.

The film's art direction was by Gunther Gerszo.

Plot 
An apprentice of photography (Cantinflas) is accidentally involved in an international complot when he ends up being left in charge of a chemical engineer (Ángel Garasa) who went insane after he invents a bomb and an attempt is made against his life.

Cast

Reception 
The film set an opening day record in Mexico grossing $5,810 at the Cine Roble.

References

Bibliography 
 Shaw, Lisa & Dennison, Stephanie. Popular Cinema in Brazil. Manchester University Press, 2004.

External links 
 

1953 comedy films
1953 films
1950s comedy thriller films
Mexican comedy thriller films
Films directed by Miguel M. Delgado
Mexican black-and-white films
1950s Mexican films